Union Township is one of fourteen townships in Miami County, Indiana, United States. As of the 2010 census, its population was 857 and it contained 363 housing units.

History
Union Township was first settled in the spring of 1835. Union Township was organized in 1837.

Geography

Unincorporated towns
 Deedsville at 
 Perrysburg at

Extinct towns
 Busaco

Cemeteries
The township contains these five cemeteries: Ebenezer,  Independent Order of Odd Fellows, Mount Zion, Leedy and Weasaw.

Major highways
  U.S. Route 31

School districts
 North Miami Community Schools

Political districts
 Indiana's 5th congressional district
 State House District 23
 State Senate District 18

References
 
 United States Census Bureau 2008 TIGER/Line Shapefiles
 IndianaMap

External links
 Indiana Township Association
 United Township Association of Indiana
 City-Data.com page for Union Township

Townships in Miami County, Indiana
Townships in Indiana